Midas Island is an island lying north-west of Apéndice Island in Hughes Bay, off the west coast of Graham Land, Antarctica. It was first seen by the Belgian Antarctic Expedition under Gerlache in 1898 and described as an island with two summits "like the ears of an ass". The name, given by the UK Antarctic Place-Names Committee in 1960, derives from this description; Midas, King of Phrygia, was represented in Greek satyric drama with the ears of an ass.

The island forms part of the Cierva Point and offshore islands Important Bird Area and Antarctic Specially Protected Area (ASPA) 134.

See also 
 List of Antarctic and subantarctic islands

References

Islands of Graham Land
Danco Coast
Important Bird Areas of Antarctica
Antarctic Specially Protected Areas